The American Union of Decorative Artists and Craftsmen (AUDAC) was an American society of designers and decorative artists that was active from 1928 until the early 1930s. The group aimed to bring modern principles of design, such as those promoted in Europe by the Wiener Werkstätte and the Bauhaus, to decorative arts in the United States.

History

The modernist furniture designer Paul T. Frankl immigrated from Vienna to New York in 1914. He worked to establish Europe's flourishing principles of contemporary design in the United States by writing books such as New Dimensions: The Decorative Arts of Today  and by establishing a collective of fellow designers called the American Union of Decorative Artists and Craftsmen (AUDAC) in 1928. Early members included designers who exhibited at the American Designers' Gallery, which showed interiors and furnishings designed by contemporary New York designers, such as Donald Deskey and Ilonka Karasz.

AUDAC was modeled on European decorative arts societies such as the Société des Artistes Décorateurs in France. They published books on the new American design such as Modern American Design and Annual of American Design and put together influential exhibitions of their members' work, including one at the Brooklyn Museum in 1931 which showed work by Russel Wright, Ruth Reeves, and Rockwell Kent among many others.

The group was well known by the early 1930s when Radio City Music Hall commissioned Donald Deskey and other AUDAC members to design the fabrics, textiles, and furnishings for the interior. Many members (see list below) went on to long careers and well-known places in the history of twentieth-century design. However, due to the 1930s economic depression, the formal association was defunct by 1934.

Mission

AUDAC placed an ad in a supplement for the magazine Creative Art in March 1930 which listed contact information for many of its members and described the mission of the American Union of Decorative Artists and Craftsmen thus:

Founders and members
Founded by Paul T. Frankl in 1928.

Members included: 

 M. F. Agha
 Richard F. Bach
 Lucian Bernhard
 M. D. C. Crawford
 Donald Deskey
 Alice Donaldson
 Hugh Ferriss
 Norman Bel Geddes
 C. Adolph Glassgold
 Wolfgang and Pola Hoffmann
 Ellen M. Kern
 Frederick John Kiesler
 Peter Larsen
 Robert Leonard
 Marguerita Mergentime
 Lewis Mumford
 Ruth Reeves
 Winold Reiss
 Robert Schey
 Lee Simonson
 Edward Steichen
 Edward Buk Ulreich
 Kem Weber
 Frank Lloyd Wright
 Russel Wright
 Paul M. Zimmermann

References

Sources

 "American Union of Decorative Artist and Craftsmen" in Byars, Mel (2004). The Design Encyclopedia, New York: The Museum of Modern Art. |

External links

Decorative arts
Graphic design
Industrial design
Textile design
Interior design
Modernism